The 1973 Rothmans International Tennis Tournament was a men's professional tennis tournament held on indoor carpet courts in the Royal Albert Hall in London, England. It was the third edition of the tournament and was held from 18 to 27 January 1973. The event was part of the 1973 World Championship Tennis circuit. Brian Fairlie won the singles title.

Finals

Singles
 Brian Fairlie defeated  Mark Cox 2–6, 6–2, 6–2, 7–6

Doubles
 Tom Okker /  Marty Riessen defeated  Arthur Ashe /  Roscoe Tanner 6–3, 6–3

References

Rothmans International Tennis Tournament
Rothmans International Tennis Tournament
Rothmans International Tennis Tournament
Rothmans International Tennis Tournament
Rothmans International Tennis Tournament